Finnvedsvallen is a football stadium in Värnamo, Sweden and the home stadium for the football team IFK Värnamo. Finnvedsvallen was inaugurated in 1935, and has a total capacity of 5,000 spectators.

References 

IFK Värnamo
Football venues in Sweden
1935 establishments in Sweden
Sports venues completed in 1935
Athletics (track and field) venues in Sweden